Neofundulus is a genus of fish in the family Rivulidae. These annual killifish are endemic to the Paraguay, Guaporé, Mamoré  and São Francisco basins in Argentina, Bolivia, Brazil and Paraguay. They inhabit temporary waters, such as swamps or ponds, that typically are located in open habitats like grassland. Once the water disappears, the adults die, but the eggs that have been laid in the bottom remain, only hatching after several months when the water returns.

Species
There are currently 8 recognized species in this genus:

 Neofundulus acutirostratus W. J. E. M. Costa, 1992
 Neofundulus aureomaculatus W. J. E. M. Costa, 2015
 Neofundulus guaporensis W. J. E. M. Costa, 1988
 Neofundulus ornatipinnis G. S. Myers, 1935
 Neofundulus paraguayensis (C. H. Eigenmann & C. H. Kennedy, 1903)
 Neofundulus parvipinnis W. J. E. M. Costa, 1988
 Neofundulus rubrofasciatus W. J. E. M. Costa, 2015
 Neofundulus splendidus D. T. B. Nielsen & Brousseau, 2013

References

Rivulidae
Freshwater fish genera
Taxa named by George S. Myers